Bipolar cylindrical coordinates are a three-dimensional orthogonal coordinate system that results from projecting the two-dimensional bipolar coordinate system in the
perpendicular -direction.  The two lines of foci 

The term "bipolar" is often used to describe other curves having two singular points (foci), such as ellipses, hyperbolas, and Cassini ovals.  However, the term bipolar coordinates is never used to describe coordinates associated with those curves, e.g., elliptic coordinates.

Basic definition

The most common definition of bipolar cylindrical coordinates  is

where the  coordinate of a point 
equals the angle  and the 

Surfaces of constant  correspond to cylinders of different radii

that all pass through the focal lines and are not concentric.  The surfaces of constant  are non-intersecting cylinders of different radii

that surround the focal lines but again are not concentric. The focal lines and all these cylinders are parallel to the -axis (the direction of projection).

Scale factors

whereas the remaining scale factor .  
Thus, the infinitesimal volume element equals

and the Laplacian is given by 

Other differential operators such as  
and  can be expressed in the coordinates  by substituting 
the scale factors into the general formulae 
found in orthogonal coordinates.

Applications
The classic applications of bipolar coordinates are in solving partial differential equations, 
e.g., Laplace's equation or the Helmholtz equation, for which bipolar coordinates allow a 
separation of variables (in 2D).  A typical example would be the electric field surrounding two 
parallel cylindrical conductors.

Bibliography

External links
MathWorld description of bipolar cylindrical coordinates

Three-dimensional coordinate systems
Orthogonal coordinate systems